The Love of Mankind is a 1972 Soviet drama film directed by Sergey Gerasimov.

Plot 
The film is about an architect who is passionate about his work and who has not experienced a feeling of love for 35 years of his life. And so he falls in love and begins to live with a woman. And he begins to understand that love brings not only happiness, but also drama.

Cast 
 Anatoliy Solonitsyn as Dmitri Kalmykov
 Lyubov Virolaynen as Mariya
 Tamara Makarova as Aleksandra Vasilyeva Petrushkova
 Zhanna Bolotova as Tanya Pavlova
 Ivan Neganov
 Mikhail Zimin
 Yury Kuzmenkov
 Yuri Volkov
 Leonid Sokolov
 N. Yegorov

References

External links 
 

1972 films
1970s Russian-language films
Soviet drama films
1972 drama films